World Backup day is a commemorative date celebrated annually by the backup industry and tech industry all over the world. The World Backup Day highlights the importance of protecting data and keeping systems and computers secure.

World Backup Day started with a post on Reddit where a user wrote about losing their hard drive and wishing someone had reminded them about how important it is to backup data. The campaign started in 2011 and every year many news outlets write articles about the importance of backing up data on World Backup Day.

Pledge and backing up data 
Every year on March 31, many companies tweet and have podcasts about the importance of backing up data to prevent data loss. On the website WorldBackupDay.com people can make a pledge in 10 languages on various social media channels about the importance of backing up their data. The World Backup Day is recognized as National Calendar Day on two national holiday websites.

References

External links
 Official site

Backup
Awareness days
Unofficial observances